Paul Alton "Lil' Buck" Sinegal (January 14, 1944 – June 10, 2019) was an American blues and zydeco guitarist and singer.

Early years
Paul Alton Senegal was born in Lafayette, Louisiana.  According to researchers Bob Eagle and Eric LeBlanc, the spelling "Sinegal" rather than "Senegal" was the result of a passport error, which he never corrected.  Senegal was nicknamed "Little Buck" (for buckwheat) or "Lil' Buck" because of his short stature.  Senegal’s mother, Odette Broussard, played guitar. In the late 1950s Senegal began performing with other musicians, such as Carol Fran, James "Thunderbird" Davis, Lee Dorsey, and Joe Tex.

Career
Senegal entered the music industry as a  session musician at Excello Records, working with musicians such as Slim Harpo, Lazy Lester. Senegal recorded with Rockin' Dopsie, as well as Katie Webster and Lil' Bob.  In the late 1960s Senegal recorded his own instrumentals, including "Cat Scream" and "Monkey in a Sack", for the La Louisiane record label.

Senegal joined Clifton Chenier's band in 1969, and toured regularly with him in Europe and elsewhere over the next decade.  Later, in the 1980s and 1990s, Senegal also toured internationally with Buckwheat Zydeco and Rockin' Dopsie.

Senegal founded the Cowboy Stew Blues Revue with C. C. Adcock.   In 1999, Senegal released the album The Buck Starts Here, featuring songs predominantly written and produced by Allen Toussaint.  Critic Richie Unterberger described the record as "a fairly straight blues album with faint or nonexistent traces of zydeco", Sinegal commented: "I am probably more known as a zydeco guitarist... [but] I've always been a bluesman...Zydeco is the blues. It's basically blues played with accordion. Clifton Chenier's music was blues throughout."

Senegal appeared in the 2015 documentary film I Am the Blues.

Death 
Senegal died at 75 in 2019 and was funeralized at Immaculate Heart of Mary Church in Lafayette.

Awards
Sinegal was inducted into the Louisiana Blues Hall of Fame in 1999.
Lil Buck Senegal was Inducted into The Louisiana Music Hall of Fame on his Birthday January 14, 2013 at the Blue Moon Cafe, Lafayette, LA. in concert.

References

1944 births
2019 deaths
Blues musicians from Louisiana
American blues guitarists
Zydeco musicians
Louisiana Creole people
People from Lafayette, Louisiana
Musicians from Lafayette, Louisiana
Guitarists from Louisiana
20th-century American guitarists
20th-century American male musicians
21st-century American guitarists
21st-century American male musicians
African-American Catholics